Spooky Tricks is a 2014 studio album by industrial disco band My Life with the Thrill Kill Kult.

Release
The album was released May 6, 2014, on Sleazebox Records (SLZ 015).

Track listing

Touring
The band toured for the album on the Spooky Tricks Tour from May 28 to July 2, 2014. This was followed by an old-school "INFERNO XPRESS style" tour with five dates in California From September 19 to November 16.
In 2015 this was followed by the 2015 Summer Sizzler with six dates from June 26 to August 16 and then the Elektrik Messiah Tour 2015 from September 17 to November 17, 2015.

Credits
 Artwork – Buzz McCoy, Groovie Mann
 Directed By – Groovie Mann
 Mastered By - Collin Jordan
 Performer – The Bomb Gang Girlz, Thrill Kill Kult
 Producer – Buzz McCoy
 Written-By – Buzz McCoy, Groovie Mann

References

External links

2014 albums
My Life with the Thrill Kill Kult albums